Electric Dreams is the fifth solo album by English jazz guitarist John McLaughlin and his "One Truth Band" (featuring violinist L. Shankar, keyboardist Stu Goldberg, bassist Fernando Saunders, percussionist Alyrio Lima and drummer Tony “Thunder” Smith) released in 1979. Between his third and fourth solo albums he spent several years leading the Mahavishnu Orchestra (which featured Goldberg), and Shakti (which featured Shankar).

While performing with Miles Davis, Davis had titled a song on the album Bitches Brew “John McLaughlin”. McLaughlin returns the favour here, naming a song "Miles Davis".

Track listing
All songs by John McLaughlin unless otherwise noted.
 "Guardian Angels" – 0:51
 "Miles Davis" – 4:54
 "Electric Dreams, Electric Sighs" – 6:57
 "Desire and the Comforter" – 7:34
 "Love and Understanding" – 6:36
 "Singing Earth" (Stu Goldberg) – 0:37
 "The Dark Prince" – 5:15
 "The Unknown Dissident" – 6:16

Personnel
John McLaughlin – Electric Guitar, 6 + 12 + 13 String Acoustic Guitars and Banjo
L. Shankar – Acoustic and Electric Violin
Stu Goldberg – Electric Piano, Moog Synthesizer with Steiner Parker Modifications, Prophet Synthesizer, Hammond Organ
Fernando Saunders – Fender Bass, Acoustic Bass, Vocals on "Love and Understanding"
Tony Thunder Smith – Drums, Vocals
Alyrio Lima – Percussion, Amplified Chinese Cymbals
David Sanborn – Alto Saxophone on "The Unknown Dissident"

Chart positions

References

1979 albums
John McLaughlin (musician) albums
Columbia Records albums